Eufaula may refer to:

Places in the United States
Cities
Eufaula, Alabama
Eufaula, Oklahoma
Eufaula, Washington

Lakes
Eufaula Lake, Oklahoma
Walter F. George Lake, Alabama–Georgia; commonly known as Lake Eufaula

Other uses
Eufaula (album), an album by the Atlanta Rhythm Section
Eufaula (YTB-800), a United States Navy Natick-class large harbor tug named for the Alabama city
Eufaula people, an indigenous people in Georgia, United States

See also
Eufala, Florida